The Sikorsky HH-52 Seaguard (company designation S-62) was an early amphibious helicopter designed and produced by the American helicopter manufacturer Sikorsky Aircraft. It was the first of the company's amphibious rotorcraft to fly.

The S-62 was originally developed as a commercial venture during the late 1950s. It combined the dynamic elements of the Sikorsky S-55 with a boat hull-shaped fuselage and a single lightweight turboshaft engine. The prototype S-62 conducted its maiden flight on 22 May 1958, powered by a single General Electric T58-GE-6 turboshaft engine. It underwent evaluation at the Naval Air Test Center in Patuxent River, Maryland, at Sikorsky's own expense as part of its effort to promote the S-62 to the United States Coast Guard (USCG).

The USCG would procure 99 S-62s, which it initially designated as the HU2S-1G Seaguard, and later re-designated as the HH-52A Seaguard. It was primarily operated by the USCG for air-sea rescue missions. Various other operators opted to procure the S-62 for their own purposes, from airliners to utility transporters, and foreign air services. It was widely used into the 1980s, by which point many operators elected to replace the type with newer rotorcraft. The HH-52 was withdrawn from USCG service during 1989 in favour of non-amphibious rotorcraft, such as the Eurocopter HH-65 Dolphin, which rely solely on the use of a winch from a low hover to conduct rescue operations.

Development
Development of the S-62 was launched by Sikorsky during the late 1950s, the initiative was initially pursued as an independent commercial venture. In concept, the project combined the dynamic elements of the earlier Sikorsky S-55 with a boat hull-shaped fuselage and a single lightweight turboshaft engine. This was a relatively ambitious design for the era, being the first of Sikorsky's amphibious helicopters.

On 22 May 1958, the prototype S-62 performed its maiden flight; in doing so, it had beat its larger Sikorsky S-61 sibling into flight by almost a year. This prototype was powered by a single General Electric T58-GE-6 turboshaft that had been derated from 1,050 hp to 670 hp, powering an identical main and tail rotor to that of the S-55.

At Sikorsky's own expense, it funded a "fly before you buy" test programme at the Naval Air Test Center in Patuxent River, Maryland; the company actively promoted the type to the United States Coast Guard (USCG) in particular. The results of this test programme was largely positive, confirming Sikorsky's performance claims and its suitability for the service. Accordingly, on 21 June 1962, Sikorsky was issued an initial production contract for the type. On 9 January 1963, the first of 99 production helicopters was delivered to the USCG. On 17 January 1969, the final example would be delivered by the company.

Design
Perhaps the most prominent feature of the S-62 is its boat hull fuselage, which was more compact but otherwise similar to the preceding Sikorsky S-61 (adopted by the US Navy as the SH-3 Sea King). This fuselage is watertight, facilitating landings on water or snow alike, and furnished with two outrigger floats that help the rotorcraft resist both pitching and rolling motions while on the water's surface. These outrigger floats also accomidated the landing gear, which was retractable. To maintain its position while on the water, it was able to deploy an anchor.

Although the S-62 bore little visual resemblance to the Sikorsky S-55, it used many of the same components. The S-62 had sufficient power to carry up to 12 passengers, or six litters, along with a crew of three.

Operational History
One prominent early use of the S-62 was with the operator San Francisco and Oakland Helicopter Airlines, one of the first helicopter airlines to operate without a federal subsidy, and the first to operate exclusively using turbine engine helicopters; the airline commenced passenger flights using a pair of two leased S-62s in June 1961, each of which being configured to carry up to ten passengers. On 21 December of that year, rival operator Los Angeles Airways performed the first scheduled service using an American turbine-powered helicopter via a leased S-62. By June 1962, three S-62s were reportedly in operation for specialised transportation purposes, such as servicing offshore oil rigs in the Gulf of Mexico, with Petroleum Helicopters. Other early civil operators included Okanagan Helicopters, which used its S-62s to supply remote radar installations, and the Canadian Department of Transport, which had the type fly resupply missions to its lighthouses.

A large fleet of 99 S-62s were purchased by the US Navy's Bureau of Aeronautics on behalf of the USCG, whom operated the type primarily for search and rescue missions. It was initially designated HU2S-1G Seaguard, but was re-designated as the HH-52A Seaguard during 1962. The HH-52 was commonly dispatched aboard the USCG's larger cutters and icebreakers. The turbine-powered helicopter could carry greater payloads and fly faster than many preceding aircraft, such as the H-19 (S-55). Being designed to be amphibious, the installation of additional flotation gear was not required for over-water flights, and rescues could be conducted by simply landing on the water. Water pickups were considered to be quicker than hoisting survivors up to the helicopter.

Across its services life, the HH-52 fleet played an active role during various emergencies and other circumstances. During the aftermath of Hurricane Betsey in 1965, the type rescued 1,200 people. The HH-52 was periodically used to provide logistical support in Antarctica. One HH-52 was present for the foundering of the oil tanker Burmah Agate on 1 November 1979, facilitating in the rescue of personnel from the affected vessels.

The HH-52 fleet was active for a total of 26 years, during which it reportedly was responsible for saving in excess of 15,000 people from various forms of life-threatening situations. Having been eclipsed by newer rotorcraft, the final flight of a HH-52 took placed on 12 September 1989, after which the type was officially withdrawn from USCG service. It was primarily replaced by the Eurocopter HH-65 Dolphin, a conventional non-amphibious helicopter.

Variants

S-62
 Prototype. First flew on 22 May 1958.
S-62A
 Amphibious transport helicopter, powered by a General Electric CT58-110-1 turboshaft engine, with accommodation for up to 11 passengers. The S-62A was the first production version.
S-62B
 One S-62 was fitted with the main rotor system of the Sikorsky S-58.
S-62C
 Company designation of the HH-52A Seaguard.
S-62J
 Produced under license in Japan by Mitsubishi.
HU2S-1G
 Original designation of the HH-52A Seaguard. Redesignated HH-52A in 1962.
HH-52A Seaguard
 Search and rescue helicopter for the United States Coast Guard; 99 built including 1 transferred to Iceland.

Operators

Military

 Japan Air Self Defense Force
 Japan Maritime Self Defense Force

 Philippine Air Force

Civilian

 Icelandic Coast Guard

 Japan Coast Guard

 Gulf Helicopters 

Royal Thai Police

 United States Coast Guard
 SFO Helicopter Airlines

Surviving aircraft

Japan

 53-4774 - S-62J on static display at Hamamatsu Air Park, Hamamatsu AB, Shizuoka.

United States

 USCG 1355 – HH-52A on static display at the National Naval Aviation Museum at Naval Air Station Pensacola in Pensacola, Florida.
 USCG 1357 – At Dillingham Airfield in Mokulēia, Hawaii.
 USCG 1370 – HH-52A on static display at Freedom Park in Omaha, Nebraska.
 USCG 1375 – HH-52A in storage at Yanks Air Museum in Chino, California.
 USCG 1378 – HH-52A on static display at the Battleship Memorial Park in Mobile, Alabama.
 USCG 1383 – HH-52A on static display at the American Helicopter Museum & Education Center in West Chester, Pennsylvania.
 USCG 1384 – On static display at CGAS Elizabeth City in Elizabeth City, North Carolina.
 USCG 1389 – At Delgado Community College in New Orleans, Louisiana.
 USCG 1394 – HH-52A on display at the Mid-Atlantic Air Museum in Reading, Pennsylvania.
 USCG 1395 – HH-52A on static display at the Classic Rotors Museum in Ramona, California.
 USCG 1398 – HH-52A in storage at CGAS Elizabeth City in Elizabeth City, North Carolina. It was previously located at Black River Technical College in Pocahontas, Arkansas.
 USCG 1397 – At Amarillo College in Amarillo, Texas.
 USCG 1415 – HH-52A on static display at the Museum of Flight in Seattle, Washington.
 USCG 1416 – HH-52A at Broward College in Pembroke Pines, Florida.
 USCG 1423 – HH-52A cockpit section only on static display at the National Museum of Naval Aviation at Naval Air Station Pensacola in Pensacola, Florida.
 USCG 1426 – HH-52A on static display at the Steven F. Udvar-Hazy Center of the National Air and Space Museum in Chantilly, Virginia. It was restored by the Coast Guard Aviation Association and went on display on 14 April 2016.
 USCG 1428 – HH-52A on static display at the New England Air Museum in Windsor Locks, Connecticut.
 USCG 1429 – HH-52A on static display at the Intrepid Sea, Air & Space Museum in New York, New York.
 USCG 1450 – HH-52A on static display at the Pima Air & Space Museum in Tucson, Arizona
 USCG 1455 – HH-52A on static display at the Aviation Hall of Fame and Museum of New Jersey in Teterboro, New Jersey.
 USCG 1459 – HH-52A in storage at the Naval Air Station Glenview Museum in Glenview, Illinois. It was previously on display at the Museum of Science and Industry.
 USCG 1462 – HH-52A on static display at the Naval Air Station Wildwood Aviation Museum in Erma, New Jersey.
 USCG 1466 – HH-52A on static display at the Selfridge Military Air Museum at Selfridge Air National Guard Base in Mount Clemens, Michigan.

Philippines

 62018 – On static display at the Philippine Air Force Museum in Pasay, Manila.

South Africa
 62-062 – S-62A on static display in Strand, Western Cape. It has been painted to resemble SH-3 bureau number 150142.

Thailand
 On static display at the Thai Police Aviation Division operations base in Bangkok, Thailand.

Specifications (HH-52A)

See also

References

Citations

Bibliography
 Endres, Günter G. World Airline Fleets 1979. Hounslow, UK: Airline Publications and Sales Ltd., 1979. .
 Leyes, Richard A. and William A. Fleming. The History of North American Small Gas Turbine Aircraft Engines. American Institute of Aeronautics and Astronautics, 2007. .
 McGowen, Stanley S. Helicopters: An Illustrated History of Their Impact. ABC-CLIO, 2005. .
 Taylor, John W. R. Jane's All The World's Aircraft 1969–70. London:Jane's Yearbooks, 1969.

External links

 The Last Flying Lifeboat on MAAM.org
 Naval Air Station Glenview Museum
 US Naval Air Station Wildwood Museum
 HELIS.com Sikorsky S-62/HH-52 Database

1960s United States helicopters
United States military helicopters
1960s United States military rescue aircraft
Search and rescue helicopters
Amphibious helicopters
Single-turbine helicopters
Aircraft first flown in 1958
HH-52 Seaguard